Pauls is a Latvian masculine given name; a cognate of the name Paul. People bearing the name Pauls include:

Pauls Butkēvičs (born 1940), Latvian actor 
Pauls Dauge (1869–1946), Latvian Bolshevik revolutionary activist and writer
Pauls Kalniņš (1872–1945), Latvian physician and politician, former President of Latvia
Pauls Kaņeps (1911–2006), Latvian cross-country skier
Pauls Pujats (born 1991), Latvian pole vaulter and track and field athlete
Pauls Putniņš (born 1937), Latvian playwright, journalist and politician
Pauls Sokolovs (1902–19??), Latvian footballer
Pauls Stradiņš (1896–1958), Latvian professor, physician, and surgeon
Pauls Stradiņš Jr (born 1963), Latvian-American physicist
Pauls Svars (born 1998), Latvian ice hockey player
Pauls Toutonghi (born 19??), American writer
Pauls Valdens (1863–1957), Latvian chemist

Latvian masculine given names